This is a list of cities that field or have fielded teams in North American men's professional sports leagues, showing the number of league championships, championship appearances, playoff appearances, and MVP wins each city has achieved. These achievements are recorded for the cities only, not the individual franchises. When a team relocates to a new city, the notable achievements in the prior city remain with that city.

Achievements counted are only from the dominant league or leagues in each of the four major North American team sports — football, baseball, basketball, and ice hockey.

Football championships include All-America Football Conference (1946-1949), American Football League (1960-1965) and National Football League (1920-1965), and Super Bowl champions. Baseball championships include World Series champions since 1903. Basketball championships include those from the National Basketball Association; its forerunner, the Basketball Association of America; and the American Basketball Association (the one beginning play in 1967). Ice hockey championships include Stanley Cup champions in the NHL era (starting in the 1917–18 season.

Football championship appearances include those that played in a game deciding the champion of the All-America Football Conference (American Football League and National Football League, and Super Bowl. Baseball championship appearances include NL and AL Pennant winners since 1903. Basketball championship appearances include those that played in a series deciding the champion of the National Basketball Association, the Basketball Association of America, and the American Basketball Association. Ice hockey championship appearances include those that played in a series deciding the winner of the Stanley Cup.

Football championship appearances include those that played in a game deciding the champion of the All-America Football Conference, American Football League and National Football League, and Super Bowl. Baseball championship appearances include NL and AL Pennant winners since 1903. Basketball championship appearances include those that played in a series deciding the champion of the National Basketball Association, the Basketball Association of America, and the American Basketball Association. Ice hockey championship appearances include those that played in a series deciding the winner of the Stanley Cup.

Football MVPs include the winner of the AP NFL MVP award and the Joe F. Carr Trophy. Baseball MVPs include the winners of the MLB MVP Awards since 1911. Basketball MVPs include the winners of the NBA MVP Award since 1955 and the NBA MVP Award since 1967. Ice hockey MVPs include the winner of the Hart Trophy.

Cities that can claim no titles, championship appearances, playoff appearances, or MVP wins have been excluded from these rankings unless they are currently represented in at least one of the four major leagues, in which case they have a zero total.

Championships

Table

Current through Super Bowl LVII

Ranking

Current through Super Bowl LVII

Multiple championships in the same season

Current through 2022 Stanley Cup Finals

Championships by decade

Current through Super Bowl LVII

2020s

2010s

2000s

1990s

1980s

1970s

1960s

1950s

1940s

1930s

1920s

1910s

1900s

Championship appearances

Table

Current through 2022 AFC/NFC Championships

Ranking

Current through 2022 AFC/NFC Championships

Multiple championship appearances in the same season

Current through 2022 Eastern/Western Conference Championships

Championship appearances by decade

Current through 2022 NL/AL Pennants

2020s

2010s

2000s

1990s

1980s

1970s

1960s

1950s

1940s

1930s

1920s

1910s

1900s

Playoff appearances

Table

Current through 2022 NFL season

Ranking

Current through 2022 NFL season

MVPs

Table

Current through 2022 NFL season

Ranking

Current through 2022 NFL season

References 

Championships
Sports teams in the United States by city